Moldova competed at the 2004 Summer Olympics in Athens, from 13 to 29 August 2004. This was the nation's third consecutive appearance at the Summer Olympics in the post-Soviet era.

Moldova sent a total of 33 athletes (26 men and 7 women), competing in eight various sports. Fourteen of them had competed previously in Sydney, including two Olympic bronze medalists: welterweight boxer Vitalie Gruşac and running target shooter and four-time Olympian Oleg Moldovan. Being the oldest and most sophisticated athlete (aged 37), Moldovan was appointed by the National Olympic Committee of the Republic of Moldova to carry the nation's flag in the opening ceremony.

For the first time since the nation's Summer Olympic debut in 1996, the Moldovans failed to claim a single medal at these Games. Weightlifter Alexandru Bratan narrowly missed the podium with a fourth-place finish in the men's heavyweight class.

Athletics

Moldovan athletes have so far achieved qualifying standards in the following athletics events (up to a maximum of 3 athletes in each event at the 'A' Standard, and 1 at the 'B' Standard).

Men
Track & road events

Field events

Combined events – Decathlon

Women
Track & road events

Field events

Boxing

Moldova has so far qualified boxers for the following events:

Cycling

Road

Judo

Moldova has qualified one judoka.

Shooting

Moldova's only shooter in Athens failed to advance to the final in the 10 metre running target event.

Men

Swimming

Moldovan swimmers earned qualifying standards in the following events (up to a maximum of 2 swimmers in each event at the A-standard time, and 1 at the B-standard time):

Men

Women

Weightlifting

Moldova has qualified three places in weightlifting.

Wrestling

Men's freestyle

See also
 Moldova at the 2004 Summer Paralympics

References

External links
Official Report of the XXVIII Olympiad
NOC Official Site 

Nations at the 2004 Summer Olympics
2004
Summer Olympics